FabricLive.06 is a DJ mix compilation album by Grooverider, as part of the FabricLive Mix Series.

Track listing

References

External links
Fabric: FabricLive.06
Allmusic: [ FabricLive.06]
Resident Advisor: FabricLive.06 review

Grooverider albums
2002 compilation albums